Desmocerus aureipennis is the species of the Lepturinae subfamily in long-horned beetle family. This species is distributed in United States and Canada.

Subspecies 
There are four subspecies included in Desmocerus aureipennis species:
 Desmocerus aureipennis aureipennis Chevrolat, 1855 
 Desmocerus aureipennis cribripennis Horn, 1881 
 Desmocerus aureipennis lacustris Linsley & Chemsak, 1972 
 Desmocerus aureipennis piperi Webb, 1905

References

Lepturinae
Beetles described in 1855